96.5 Bolton FM is a community radio station based in Bolton, United Kingdom. Their studios are located above Bolton's Ashburner Street Market. The station launched at 11am on 20 June 2009  at the One Bolton Festival event.

They were awarded the title of 'Best Loved Local Radio Station in the UK' during the 2011 nationwide "Thebestof" campaign called '14 Days of Love' as well as winning numerous other awards.

Featuring regular shows such as This is Bolton with Kevan Williams, Weekend Breakfast with Andy Haslam, Hits and Headlines with Big H and Club Tropicana with Kevin Gurney, the station appeals to a wide audience. They can also be regularly seen out in the Bolton Community hosting roadshows and broadcasting live from several locations. The station also provided technical staff for two Bolton Hospice events: Strictly Learn to Dance, and the Midnight Memories walk.

The station has several high-profile connections including former Labour Whip Frank White as the station's former chairman, and radio professional Darryl Morris as a former Director. Former Big Brother UK housemate Luke Marsden is also well-known for having presented his own show on the station.

The station broadcasts a live sports programme on Saturday afternoons, including live match commentaries on Bolton Wanderers league and cup matches during the football season.

References

External links
 Bolton FM official website

Mass media in the Metropolitan Borough of Bolton
Radio stations in Greater Manchester
Radio stations established in 2009
Community radio stations in the United Kingdom